Tyddyn Dai is a hamlet in the community of Amlwch, Ynys Môn, Wales, which is 141.4 miles (227.6 km) from Cardiff and 220.7 miles (355.1 km) from London.

References

See also
List of localities in Wales by population 

Villages in Anglesey